Lamine Kaba Sherif (born 27 January 1999) is a Guinean professional footballer who plays as a midfielder for Ilkeston Town on loan from  side Peterborough Sports.

Club career
Kaba Sherif joined the Leicester City academy at under-10 level, and turned professional in 2017. He was released from Leicester in June 2019.

Kaba Sherif joined Accrington Stanley on a two-year contract in July 2019. On 3 August 2019, he made his league debut for Accrington as a 79th minute substitute during a 2–0 defeat to Lincoln City.

On 14 May 2021 it was announced that he would leave Accrington at the end of the season, following the expiry of his contract.

In August 2021 he signed for Kettering Town. On 2 January 2022, it was announced that Kaba Sherif had left the club after making 9 league appearances.

On 11 February 2022, Sherif joined National League North side AFC Telford United on a non-contract basis.

In March 2022, Sherif signed for Southern League Premier Division Central side Peterborough Sports.

In November 2022, Sherif joiend Southern League Premier Division Central side Ilkeston Town on loan.

International career
In March 2019, Kaba Sherif received a callup from the Guinea under-23 team.

References

External links
Profile at Aylesbury United

1999 births
Living people
People from Conakry
Guinean footballers
Association football midfielders
Leicester City F.C. players
Accrington Stanley F.C. players
Kettering Town F.C. players
AFC Telford United players
Peterborough Sports F.C. players
National League (English football) players
English Football League players
Southern Football League players
Guinean expatriate footballers
Guinean expatriate sportspeople in England
Expatriate footballers in England
Ilkeston Town F.C. players